Nikolay Georgiev Bodurov (born 30 May 1986) is a Bulgarian professional footballer who plays for Pirin Blagoevgrad and the Bulgarian national team. Bodurov plays mainly as a centre back but has also played as a right back on some occasions.

He started his professional career at his hometown club Pirin Blagoevgrad, playing five seasons before moving to Litex Lovech in 2009, with whom he won two league titles. In 2014, he signed with Fulham for a fee in the region of €1 million and then spent time on loan at Midtjylland during the 2015–16 season. In August 2016, his contract with Fulham was cancelled by mutual consent.

Internationally, Bodurov made his debut for Bulgaria in 2010.

Career

Pirin Blagoevgrad
Born in Blagoevgrad, Bodurov started to play football at early age with Pirin 1922. He made his way through the youth ranks at the club before making his first team debut on 8 August 2004 against Shumen, when he was only 18 years old. Bodurov quickly established himself in the Pirin 1922 first-team. He earned 29 league appearances in 2004–05 season and helped the team to win promotion to A Group.

Bodurov scored his only goal for Pirin during a 2007–08 season. On 27 October 2007, he scored a last-minute goal to secure a 1–0 away win over Vidima-Rakovski.

In the 2008–09 season with the team, he qualified for the final of Bulgarian Cup. Bodurov played in 125 matches at the club of Blagoevgrad until 2009.

Litex Lovech

In July 2009, Litex Lovech signed Bodurov on a four-year deal. He was given the number 33 shirt. He made his competitive debut for Litex on 1 August 2009, against Levski Sofia for the Bulgarian Supercup. Bodurov made his league debut against Montana on 30 August, playing the full 90 minutes. The game ended with a 3–0 victory to Litex. On 25 March 2010, he netted his first goal for the club, scoring header in the 1–0 home win against Sliven 2000. In his first season playing for Litex, he made 18 appearances in the A PFG and ended the season winning his first league golden medal. During a campaign, he was mainly used as a right-back.

On 20 December 2010, Bodurov was named 2010 A PFG Defender of the Year. He collected his second A PFG title winner's medal at the end of the 2010–11 season.

On 3 August 2011, he scored the only goal for Litex in a 1–3 away loss against Wisła Kraków in the Champions League qualifying match. On 21 August 2011, as a result of injury to regular captain Nebojša Jelenković, Bodurov captained Litex for the first time in the last 22 minutes against Svetkavitsa at the Lovech Stadium in a 6–0 Litex victory. A week later, he scored his first league goal of the 2011–12 season in a 2–0 win at Slavia Sofia.

Fulham
On 1 August 2014, Bodurov signed a three-year contract with English side Fulham with an additional one-year option. The 28-year-old immediately joined up with his new club on their pre-season tour of Austria at a training camp in Innsbruck. He made his league debut in the opening game of the season, in a 2–1 loss to Ipswich Town on 9 August, playing full 90 minutes in the centre of defence. Bodurov scored his first goal for Fulham to open the scoring against Derby County in a 2–0 home win on 28 February 2015. Bodurov's contract was cancelled by mutual consent on 26 August 2016.

FC Midtjylland (loan)
On 1 February 2016, Bodurov signed on loan for Midtjylland for the remainder of the campaign. He played 15 games in the Danish Superliga and helped his team finish third. Bodurov also participated in Europa League matches against Manchester United, scoring an own goal.

CSKA Sofia
On 23 January 2017, Bodurov signed with CSKA Sofia until the end of the season. He quickly established himself as a key player for the "redmen", but was frozen out of the first team in August 2019 (alongside Rúben Pinto) by manager Ljupko Petrović, reportedly for disciplinary reasons. After Petrović's resignation, it was confirmed by owner Grisha Ganchev that Bodurov will not be reinstated to the first team.

Esteghlal
On 30 January 2020, Bodurov signed for Iranian club Esteghlal on a six-month contract until the end of the season, with an option to extend his contract until the end of the 2020–21 season. He was handed the number 20 jersey. On 10 February 2020, he made his official debut for the club in an AFC Champions League away match against Al-Shorta.

International career
On 8 October 2010, Bodurov made his debut for the Bulgarian national team in the 1–0 away win in a Euro 2012 qualifying match against Wales in Cardiff. During a 2014 World Cup qualifying match against Denmark on 26 March 2013, Bodurov ruptured his ligament of ankle, and received surgery two days later. He reclaimed his starting spot for the national team following his return from injury, but was sent off on 11 October 2013, in the 1–2 away loss against Armenia in a World Cup qualifier.

On 9 September 2014, Bodurov captained his country for the first time in the 2–1 away victory over Azerbaijan in a Euro 2016 qualifier after regular captain Ivelin Popov had sustained an injury a few days prior to the match. He subsequently dedicated the win to Popov.

International goals
Scores and results list Bulgaria's goal tally first.

Career statistics

Club

Updated 17 February 2020

National team

Honours

Litex Lovech
 Bulgarian League (2): 2009–10, 2010–11
 Bulgarian Supercup: 2010

Personal life
Bodurov has a daughter, named Nikol, who was born in 2017.

References

1986 births
Living people
Bulgarian footballers
Bulgaria international footballers
Association football defenders
PFC Pirin Blagoevgrad players
PFC Litex Lovech players
Fulham F.C. players
FC Midtjylland players
PFC CSKA Sofia players
Esteghlal F.C. players
OFC Pirin Blagoevgrad players
First Professional Football League (Bulgaria) players
English Football League players
Bulgarian expatriate footballers
Bulgarian expatriate sportspeople in England
Expatriate men's footballers in Denmark
Bulgarian expatriate sportspeople in Denmark
Sportspeople from Blagoevgrad